Hednota relatalis is a moth of the family Crambidae described by Francis Walker in 1863. It is found in Australia, in  Australian Capital Territory, Victoria, Tasmania, South Australia, and Western Australia.

References

Crambinae
Moths of Australia
Moths described in 1863